Porvoo Hunters is an ice hockey club based in Porvoo, Finland. The team played the 2018–19 season in Suomi-sarja (the third top league in Finland after Liiga and Mestis. During the 2018-2019 season they finished 2nd overall and qualified for the promotion playoffs (for the first time) against Peliitat.

External links
porvoohunters.fi

References

Sport in Porvoo
Ice hockey teams in Finland
Ice hockey clubs established in 1997
1997 establishments in Finland